The International Journal of Environmental Science and Technology is a monthly peer reviewed scientific journal covering environmental science, technology, engineering, and management. It was established in 2004 and is published by Springer Science+Business Media. The editor-in-chief is Madjid Abbaspour.

Abstracting and indexing
This journal is abstracted and indexed in:

According to the Journal Citation Reports, the journal has a 2020 impact factor of 2.860.

References

External links

Unique journal website
Published paper open access

Springer Science+Business Media academic journals
Publications established in 2004
Monthly journals
English-language journals
Environmental science journals